Akhun is a Uyghur surname. Notable people with the surname include:

Islam Akhun, Uyghur con-man
Omar Akhun, Uyghur composer and musician
Turdi Akhun (1881–1956), Uyghur folk musician

See also
 Mount Akhun

Uyghur-language surnames